Theule Khola Hydropower Station (Nepali: ठिउले खोला जलविद्युत आयोजना) is a run-of-river hydro-electric plant located in   Baglung District of Nepal. The flow from Theule River is used to generate 1.5 MW electricity.

The plant is owned and developed by Barahi Hydropower Pvt Ltd, an IPP of Nepal. The plant started generating electricity from 2075-03-24BS. The generation licence will expire in 2107-03-27 BS, after which the plant will be handed over to the government.  The power station is connected to the national grid and the electricity is sold to Nepal Electricity Authority.

The power generated from the project will make up around 40 per cent of electricity demand for the district.

The project cost was NPR 345 million.

See also

List of power stations in Nepal

References

Hydroelectric power stations in Nepal
Gravity dams
Run-of-the-river power stations
Dams in Nepal
Irrigation in Nepal